Dorohedoro is an anime television series adaptation of the manga of the same name by Q Hayashida, first announced in the December 2018 issue of Shogakukan's Monthly Shōnen Sunday magazine released on November 12, 2018. The series is produced by MAPPA and directed by Yuichiro Hayashi, with series composition by Hiroshi Seko, character designs by Tomohiro Kishi, and music composed by R.O.N of (K)NoW_NAME. It ran for 12 episodes from January 12 to March 29, 2020 on Tokyo MX.<ref></p></ref> The 9th episode was broadcast the first time with an image in the background that caused controversy and was later changed for release in home-video and for streaming services.

The opening theme "Welcome to Chaos" and the series' ending themes "Who am I ?" (ep. 1, 2 and 7), "Night SURFING" (ep. 3–4), "D.D.D.D." (ep. 5–6), "Strange Meat Pie"(ep. 8–9), "SECONDs FLY" (ep. 10–11) and "404" (ep. 12), are performed by (K)NoW_NAME. A six OVA episodes were bundled with the series' second Blu-ray release on June 17, 2020.

Dorohedoro was released on May 28, 2020 on Netflix outside of Japan. The six OVA episodes were also made available on Netflix on October 15, 2020 as one long singular episode, labeled as episode 13.


Episode list

OVAs

References

Dorohedoro